Floyd Cooper may refer to:

 Floyd Cooper (Canadian football), official in the Canadian Football League
 Floyd Cooper (illustrator), American illustrator of children's books